EFW may refer to:
 Economic Freedom of the World
 Energy-from-waste, see Waste-to-energy
 Jefferson Municipal Airport, in Jefferson, Iowa, IATA airport code EFW
 Electric Field and Wave experiment, a scientific instrument on the Cluster space mission
 Elbe Flugzeugwerke, a Dresden-based subsidiary of Airbus and ST Aerospace specialising in freighter and tanker conversion